Toru Nakamura may refer to:

, Japanese golfer
, Japanese actor